Shail may refer to:

People
 Gary Shail (born 1959), English actor, director, producer and musician
 Mark Shail (born 1966), English football player
 Shail Chaturvedi (1936–2007), Indian author
 Shail Hada (born 1975), Indian singer
 Shail Upadhya (1935–2013), Nepalese diplomat

Places
 Shri Shail, India

See also
 Shale (disambiguation)